Gusano (or fem. gusana) (lit. worm) is a pejorative term used to refer to Cubans who fled Cuba following the rise of Fidel Castro after the Cuban Revolution, although the term was later broadly expanded to include anyone who expressed anti-revolutionary views or was a political dissident. The term has connotations referring to class, with the word being used to insinuate that someone aspired to protect their wealth from redistribution following the rise of socialism in Cuba. By some reports, at one point, the term was even extended to refer to those who believed in God as a higher power than the state.

Origins 
Cuba experienced several waves of immigration after the revolution, with political dissidents and wealthy Cubans leaving in the first waves during the 1960s. By 1962, over 200,000 had already left the country. The number increased to 500,000 by the beginning of 1969. During the 1990s, many poorer Cubans left due to economic stagnation, especially following the collapse of the Soviet Union. Out of these exiles, the first waves of exiles in the 1960s first bore the term gusano. By the 1960s and 1970s, Castro and his supporters had widely adopted the term in speeches and discussion to refer to Cubans that have fled the country, as well as the Cubans that applied to leave. The term supposedly originated in a 1961 speech that Castro gave where he discussed "shaking the rotten tree, and the gusanos will drop out", in reference to the counter-revolutionaries. Many chants would evolve from the phrase, such as "Con saya o pantalon, gusanos al paredon." (If wearing skirts or if wearing pants, gusanos will [turn and face] the wall [to be executed]).

During the first wave of exodus from Cuba, reports came out from the Havana Airport stated that insults towards gusanos were being blared from the loudspeakers by airport officials.

To a lesser extent, many Cubans who stayed in the country, but were against the revolution, adopted the label as a badge of honor (or a symbol of oppression), referring to themselves as gusano or gusana to state their dissatisfaction with the Castro regime. Despite that fact, many pieces of Cuban propaganda contained imagery of the gusano and the desire to crush anti-revolutionaries. In response, anti-revolutionaries began distributing "gusano leaflets" with political cartoons involving worms. Throughout the years of Cuban exile, many alleged raids and attacks by defectors from Cuba, according to the AP, were utilized by Castro in propaganda to further strengthen their position as an enemy of the current regime. Throughout the 60's, reports came out of the Castro regime encouraging public attacks of people branded with the label.

Usage in post-revolution Cuba 
In the 1960s, the Cuban state-run newspaper, Revolución, had a daily column which featured political cartoons that featured drawings of worms, paired with a list of activities of Cubans in exile. In response, many self-identified gusanos bought and sold keyrings with worms on them to demonstrate pride in the label.

The military fort, Castillo del Príncipe, was used in the 1960s to house political prisoners of Castro that had been captured. Their wives would frequent the establishment in hopes to see their husbands and sons, and due to the large amount of anti-revolutionary women loitering around, the prison became colloquially known as La Gusaneria.

By 1961, several thousand Cubans were employed at The United States Guantanamo Bay Naval Base, and were subject to different labor conditions outsider of the collectivized Cuban system. They were referred to as gusanos by the public. This exists as an early example of Cubans being assigned the term who were not necessarily anti-revolutionary or in exile.

The term was also prevelent in hate crimes against anti-revolutionary Cubans. In September or October of 1961, over the course of a week, 12 deceased bodies were discovered over Havana with notes attached to them that said "gusanos with pro-revolutionary [ideologies], CIA agents, who tried to escape to the United States." In a mass-jailing of political dissidents in 1961, Castro's regime used defunct sewers as prisons for accused anti-revolutionaries. In one of the sewers, a Canadian priest who had been imprisoned dressed an icon in a dress and called her "The Virgin of the Gusanos".

During the 1962 wildfires that destroyed sugarcane plantations, locals in Cubas were reported saying that "gusanos have infiltrated the canefields." This lead to quick military tribunals resulting in death by firing squad for "gusanos" who sought to destroy Cuban farms. The gusano strawman became a common tool of propaganda by the Cuban government. In a 1961 speech in Santiago de Cuba, Raúl Castro said, "Our motherland will be attacked again by those gusanos allied with [American] imperialism, who will try to bring back all the bad things that the revolution is dominating. Our country will [be prepared] to elimate them." Vigilante groups were formed for people to report their neighbors for "anti-revolutionary behavior", labelling them gusanos. The said anti-revolutionaries would be illegally detained by the government. Imprisoned political dissidents awaiting trial are recorded to have carved Soy Gusano on their jail cells.

In an interview with the Tampa Tribune, Cuban professional boxer Luis Manuel Rodríguez, who had been critical of Castro, recalled a time when a Cuban soldier came up to him with a machine gun, called him a gusano, and put a threat on his life.

Anyone who was accused or revealed to be building a stockpile of food outside of government rations were also labeled gusanos. The 20 and 25 Centavo coins were given gusano as a nickname due to a shortage of the coins that was rumored to be caused by anti-revolutionaries hoarding them for personal use. Many in the late 60's who applied to leave the country were forced to work farms as gusano laborers before their departure was approved by the Cuban government. According to British reporter Michael Frayn of the London Observer, in 1969, there were as many as 200,000 laborers working in the agricultural camps at any given point, and that only a quarter could expect to be granted leave by the end of the year.

Bay of Pigs Invasion 
The use of the word was exacerbated by the Bay of Pigs Invasion, when many Cuban dissidents were taken prisoner by Castro's government. The term then began to develop heavier connotations with the portrayal of dissidents as "American puppets". In May 1961, that stigma continued when a state-run radio station called Costa Rican politicians gusanos in response to a call from their government urging the OAS to take action against the Cuban government. Over 1,000 men were captured during the invasion, and Castro issued a ransom to the United States, saying "Si los imperialistas no quieren que sus gusanos trabajen, que los cambien por tractores." (If the imperialist [Americans] do not want their [prisoners] (gusanos) to labor, let them be exchanged for tractors).

The invasion sparked mass hysteria among revolutionaries, who locked up between 150,000 and 200,000 Cuban citizens who were accused of being gusanos. Many public buildings, such as the Sports City building, were converted into makeshift prisons to hold all the detainees.

In relation to the anti-American and anti-revolutionary ties, the term was stigmatized further upon the labelling of terrorists as gusanos who sought to destroy the country. In November 1961, Pedro Arias Hernandez, who was stationed at Guanabacoa's Nico Lopez Refinery, was killed when 3 people attacked the state-run business. The killers were labelled gusanos by the media, and were accused of working for the CIA. Many protests, including demonstrations against the famine, unrelated to Socialism directly, had their protestors classified as gusanos. In 1962, Castro said that "those gusanos must be stopped. The street belongs to us, the gusano parlachin, the quintacolumnista must be punished physically, but wihout taking him to the wall. Now, if they engage in sabotage, that is another matter..."

Usage in the United States 
Starting as early as the late 1950s, after the settlement of the Cuban diaspora, large portions of Cubans settled in Florida, and specifically in Miami. Florida's proximity to Cuba naturally led to a large influx of Cubans in the region, hence, much of the use of the word gusano was found in those areas with a high concentration of Cubans.

In 1970, Spanish Tampa newspaper El Sol received messages from pro-Castro Cubans who threatened the paper's advertisers, saying "Merchants who advertise in El Sol sink to the level of gusanos, and will be boycotted if they persist, [be] warned." 

Evidence of usage of the word towards the religious was shown in the same year, when Hispanic Chicago street gang, The Young Lords, referred to the First Spanish United Methodist Church congregation as being a gusano establishment.

In a piece called Intolerancia, Miami Herald writer Roberto Luque Escalona describes his frustration with the term, with it being prevalent among supporters of Castro and often targeted at Cuban entrepreneurs in Florida. Escalona showed an example of the caricature of la gusanera de Miami, with a stigma being attached to Cubans who moved to Florida and make their own livings under private enterprises, compared to the government-run economy of Cuba.

Other usage 
The use of the term is not only limited to Cuba and Cubans. In 1962, The Chilean Communist state-run press accused "Cuban gusanosin Miami" of having planned an attempt on the life of then-president Jorge Alessandri during his stopover in Washington, D.C. on December 10th.

During the late 1960s, former Bolivian Minister of the Interior Antonio Arguedas gave press interviews following his involvement in the publication of Che Guevara's diary in late 1967. He reported that prior to his fleeing of Bolivia to Chile, it was a common occurrence in the Bolivian Cabinet to refer to their Cuban colleagues in exile as gusanos.

References 

Cuban culture
Cuban-American culture
Slang
Slang terms for people